The  Legislative Assembly of Azad Jammu and Kashmir, also known as AJK Legislative Assembly, is a unicameral legislature of elected representatives of the Pakistani administered state of Azad Kashmir, which is located in Muzaffarabad, the capital of the state. It was established under the Interim Constitution of AJK having a total of 53 seats, with 41 general seats, while 8 are reserved of which 5 are for women, 1 for Ulama, 1 for Technocrats and 1 for J&K nationals residing abroad. 

The assembly consist of 41 elected Members and 8 co-opted members of which 5 are woman, one member from Ulama community, while one is from amongst Jammu & Kashmir technocrats and other professionals, whereas one is from amongst Jammu and Kashmir nationals residing abroad.

Members of Legislative Assembly

Tenure 
The members of legislative Assembly are elected for a five-year term on the basis of adult franchise and one person, one vote.

List of Assembles of Azad Kashmir

See also
 2016 Azad Kashmiri general election
 Constituency LA-37 Jammu - 4 (Narowal)
 Government of Azad Kashmir
 List of Azad Kashmir Legislative Assembly constituencies
 President of Azad Kashmir
 Prime Minister of Azad Kashmir

References

External links
 

Provincial Assemblies of Pakistan
Punjab
Government of Azad Kashmir